Crime in Washington may refer to:

 Crime in Washington (state)
 Crime in Washington, D.C.